Palais des sports René-Bougnol, or FDI Stadium for sponsorship reasons, is an indoor sporting arena located in Montpellier, France. The seating capacity of the arena is 3,000 people. It is currently home to the Montpellier Handball team.

References

Indoor arenas in France
Handball venues in France